United Nations Security Council resolution 508, adopted unanimously on 5 June 1982, after recalling previous resolutions including 425 (1978), 426 (1978) and 501 (1982), demanded an end of foreign hostilities taking place on Lebanese territory between the Palestinian Liberation Organization and Israel. Israel stressed that they were upset that resolution 508 did not mention or suggest that the Palestine Liberation Organization were to blame for the attack on the Israeli ambassador.

The resolution went on to call for a ceasefire by 0600 local time on 6 June 1982, so that 490 (1981) can be respected. It also requested the Secretary-General to undertake all possible efforts to ensure the implementation of and compliance with this resolution and to report to the council as early as possible and not later than forty-eight hours after the adoption of this resolution.

See also 
 1982 Lebanon War
 Israeli–Lebanese conflict
 Lebanese Civil War
 List of United Nations Security Council Resolutions 501 to 600 (1982–1987)
 Syrian occupation of Lebanon
 United Nations Interim Force in Lebanon

References
Text of the Resolution at undocs.org

External links
 

 0508
 0508
Israeli–Lebanese conflict
1982 in Israel
1982 in Lebanon
 0508
June 1982 events